Juan Vernet Ginés or Joan Vernet i Ginés (1923 - 2011) was a Spanish science historian, Arabist and professor at the University of Barcelona for over thirty years. He was the pupil and intellectual heir of orientalist Maria Millàs Vallicrosa. The rigor and scope of his scholarly work give him international authority in the field of the history of science and cultural transfers between East and West. Author of the book "What culture owes to the Arabs of Spain", he is also a translator of the quran and the Thousand and One Nights in the Spanish language (Castilian).

Bibliography 
Juan Vernet was born on 31 July 1923 in Barcelona in a family originating in Tarragona. In the years 1931–1932, Juan Vernet is a student at Colegio Alemán (German College), located in Barcelona3. In 1933, he attended the municipal school of Prades (province of Tarragona. From 1936 until 1939, he was studying for his baccalaureate at the Salmerón Institute, rue Muntaner in Barcelona4. He learns French by memorizing texts and translating news. In his intellectual autobiography. Affected very young by chronic bronchitis, which afflicted him all his life, he is forced to long months of confinement and bed rest that he devotes to study. As a teenager, he begins to decipher cuneiform writing when he can visit the prestigious Ateneo Library in Barcelona where he discovers the Assyriology Journal and the works containing the Hammurabi correspondence.

References

1923 births
2011 deaths
University of Barcelona
Spanish Arabists
20th-century Spanish historians